The Latvia Men's National Floorball Team is the national floorball team of Latvia, and a member of the International Floorball Federation. Its biggest successes are seven fifth places from the World Championships in 2006, 2008, 2010, 2014, 2018, 2020 and 2022 a and the fourth place from the  floorball tournament at the 2022 World Games.

World Championship

Rankings and Records

Rankings

IFF World Floorball Championships record 

played in B-Division

See also
 International Floorball Federation
 IFF World Ranking

References

External links
Official Team Page
Team page on IFF site

Latvian floorball teams
Men's national floorball teams
National sports teams of Latvia